= Aryamehr Quran =

1965 version commissioned by the Shah of Iran

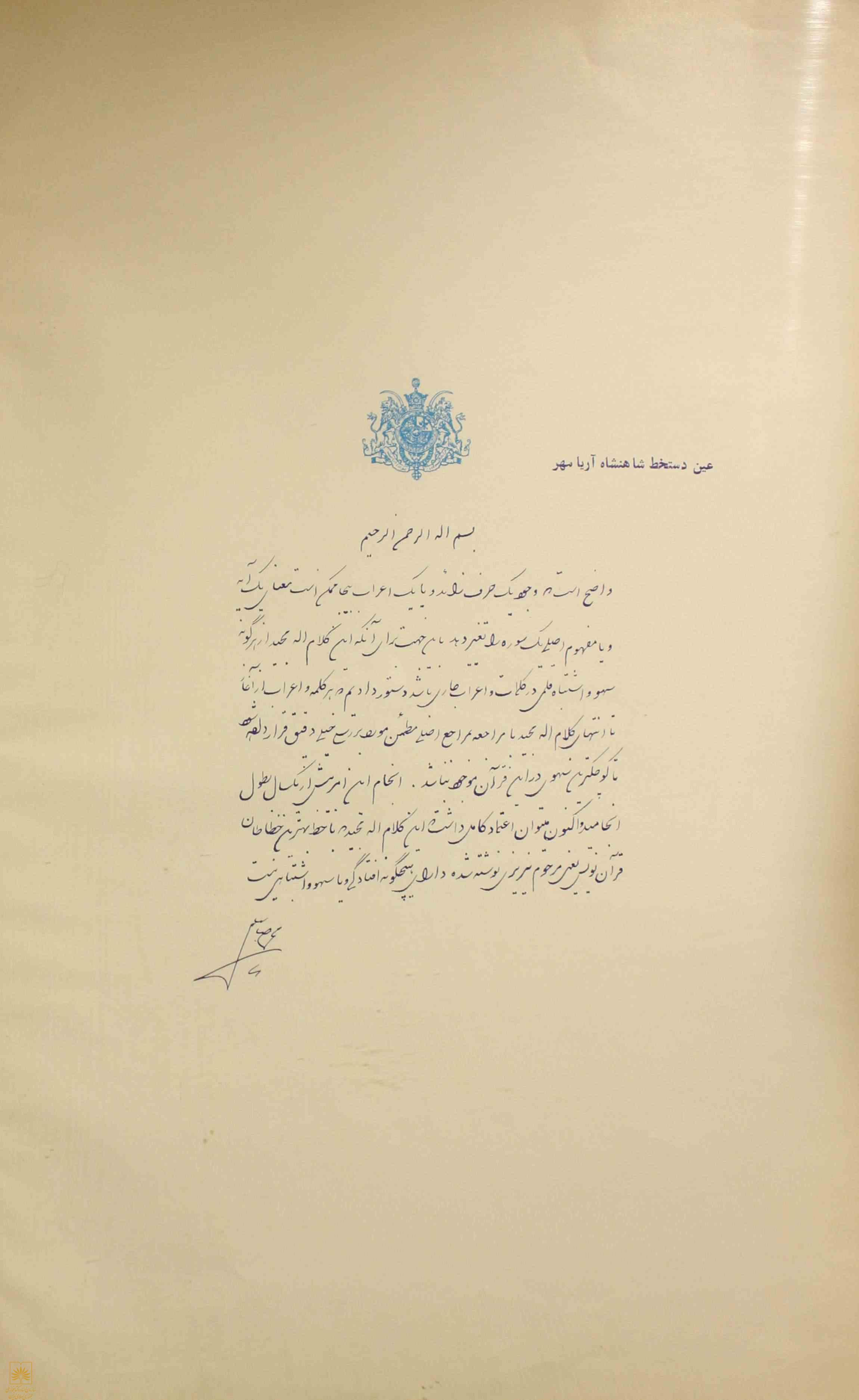
Mohammad Reza Shah's handwritten dedication in the Aryamehr Quran

Aryamehr Quran or Pahlavi Quran (In Persian language: قرآن آریامهر) is a Quran manuscript published in 1965 (1344 SH) under the order of Mohammad Reza Pahlavi, the then Shah of Iran. The calligraphy is based on the work of Ahmad Neyrizi, a renowned 18th-century laet Safavid-era calligrapher, and was edited by Abdolrahim Nejat, who was a professor of theology at the University of Tehran.

== Background ==
In 1963 (1342 SH), the Shah of Iran, Mohammad Reza Pahlavi, decided to publish a 'luxury version' of the Quran. He selected a manuscript attributed to Ahmad Neyrizi, a master calligrapher from the Safavid period, which was held in the royal library. The manuscript was corrected and updated based on contemporary standards and then published in an exquisite edition. The move was seen by some religious opponents of the Shah as a political gesture intended to gain favor with the clergy amid growing tensions.

== Description ==
This Quran edition does not include a Persian translation. It features exquisite calligraphy by Ahmad Neyrizi, known for his elegant scripts during the Safavid dynasty. The pages are decorated with gold leaf and marginal illumination, and the print is of high quality, in large format (folio size), with a hardcover binding of synthetic and leather spine.

== Controversy and rejection ==
Despite the luxurious design and effort, the printed Qurans were met with criticism from some members of the clergy. After being distributed across various regions of Iran, some religious leaders rejected the edition, with a few declaring its purchase as forbidden (haram), describing it as a symbolic gesture of placing the Quran on spears—an allusion to political manipulation.
